David Gershon Trager (December 23, 1937 – January 5, 2011) was a United States district judge of the United States District Court for the Eastern District of New York.

Education

Born in Mount Vernon, New York, Trager received a Bachelor of Arts degree from Columbia University in 1959 and a Bachelor of Laws from Harvard Law School in 1962. He was in private practice of law in New York City from 1963 to 1967, acting as assistant corporation counsel to New York City in 1967. He was a law clerk to Kenneth B. Keating of the New York State Court of Appeals from 1968 to 1969, and to Stanley H. Fuld, Chief Judge of the Court of Appeals in 1969.

Career

Trager became an Assistant United States Attorney of Eastern District of New York from 1970 to 1972. He was an associate professor of law at Brooklyn Law School from 1972 to 1974. He was United States Attorney for the Eastern District of New York from 1974 to 1978.

He returned to Brooklyn Law School as a professor of law from 1978 to 1993, serving as dean of that institution from 1983 to 1993. He chaired a temporary state commission on investigations in New York State from 1983 to 1990, and was a member of the New York City Mayor's Committee on the Judiciary from 1981 to 1989.

Federal judicial service

On August 6, 1993, Trager was nominated by President Bill Clinton to a new seat on the United States District Court for the Eastern District of New York created by 104 Stat. 5089; He was confirmed by the United States Senate on November 20, 1993, and received commission on November 24, 1993. Trager assumed senior status on March 1, 2006.

Recusal

In 1994, Trager was recused from working on the Crown Heights riot, due to potential bias as well as impartiality.

Death

Trager died, in his home in Brooklyn, of pancreatic cancer on January 5, 2011, aged 73.

References

Sources

|-

|-

1937 births
2011 deaths
Assistant United States Attorneys
Brooklyn Law School faculty
Deaths from cancer in New York (state)
Deaths from pancreatic cancer
Columbia College (New York) alumni
Harvard Law School alumni
Judges of the United States District Court for the Eastern District of New York
Deans of law schools in the United States
People from Mount Vernon, New York
People from Brooklyn
United States Attorneys for the Eastern District of New York
United States district court judges appointed by Bill Clinton
Deans of Brooklyn Law School
20th-century American judges
21st-century American judges